Park Jin-young (born September 22, 1994), known mononymously as Jinyoung, and formerly as Jr. and Junior, is a South Korean singer, actor, and songwriter. He is a member of the boy band Got7 and boy band duo JJ Project. He made his acting debut in the drama Dream High 2 (2012) followed by a series of supporting roles until he landed a main role in He Is Psychometric (2019). He made his film debut in the independent film A Stray Goat (2016).

Biography

Park is a native of Udo Island, Jinhae-gu, Changwon, where his grandparents reside, but grew up in Yongwon-dong, Jinhae-gu. He had childhood ambitions to be an entertainer and appear on TV since his fifth year of primary school. His mother was against it and, when Park was attending his sixth year, she sent him to an audition for SM Entertainment, agreeing that, if he failed, he would give up; however, he made it to the third and final preliminary round and won the popularity award. As the family's opposition diminished, he started taking dance classes at Busan Dance School in Seomyeon and Haeundae starting from the winter vacation of his first year of middle school, although he didn't take it seriously for the first three months until his father reproached him. After three months of intense practice, he was able to dance, and in 2009 he successfully auditioned for JYP Entertainment, winning first place at the open audition with Jay B over 10,000 applicants; he subsequently moved to Seoul alone. At that time he only liked dancing, but, thinking seriously about his future, he realized that he loved music as a whole.

Career

2011–2014: Acting, JJ Project and debut with Got7 
In 2011, after six months of acting classes, Park was cast in the role of Jung Ui-bong in the television drama Dream High 2. The drama began airing on January 30, 2012, on KBS. On February 29, he released the song "We Are The B" for the drama's soundtrack, along with Jinwoon, Kang So-ra and Kim Ji-soo.

In May 2012, Park and fellow trainee JB debuted as the duo JJ Project with the single album Bounce. On March 11, 2013, it was announced that he would be appearing as Ddol-yi on MBC's new drama When a Man Falls in Love, which aired for twenty episodes beginning April 3.

On January 16, 2014, Park debuted as a vocalist in JYP Entertainment's new boy group Got7. Their first EP was released soon after on January 20 and Park made the choreography for one of the songs, "Follow Me".

2015–2017: Hosting and acting roles
In 2015, he was cast in a supporting role in the drama This is My Love, which aired on JTBC from May 29 to July 18. Although the previous roles hadn't sparked his interest in acting, while filming This is My Love Park realized that it was actually fun, and the memories of that time prompted him to continue working as an actor.

The same year in March he was hired as official host for M Countdown alongside Shinee's Key, group member BamBam and CNBLUE's Jung-shin. Park left his position as MC in March 2016 to focus on activities with Got7, including the group's first worldwide concert tour.

In 2016, Park was cast as the male lead in the independent film A Stray Goat, directed by Cho Jae-min: in the film, he played a high school student who moves to the town of Goseong where he meets a girl, who is an outcast because of rumors and suspicions about her father. The movie was theatrically released on March 1, 2017, and premiered at the 17th Jeonju International Film Festival.

In September 2016, he was cast for a supporting role in the drama The Legend of the Blue Sea, where he portrayed the teenage version of Lee Min-ho's character, the protagonist of the series.

In February 2017, SBS announced Park, NCT's Doyoung, and Blackpink's Jisoo as the new fixed MCs of Inkigayo.

2018–2020: Transition to leading roles

In December 2018, Park landed his first lead role in the fantasy rom-com drama He Is Psychometric alongside Kim Kwon, Kim Da-som and Shin Ye-eun.

In September 2019, he held his first solo fan meeting in Bangkok for promoting his drama He Is Psychometric.

In 2020, Park starred in the television series When My Love Blooms alongside Yoo Ji-tae, Lee Bo-young and Jeon So-nee, and was cast in the movie Yaksha: Ruthless Operations as the youngest member of a team of spies in foreign countries dedicated to overseas missions.

In July, Park held the online fan meeting Hear, Here to commemorate the release of the photobook of the same name.

In August, he was confirmed as the main lead in the tvN legal drama The Devil Judge alongside Ji Sung as associate judge Kim Ga-on. The drama premiered in July 2021.

Throughout 2020, he collaborated with Tom Ford Beauty to promote Rose Prick Eau de Parfum, make-up line Shade and Illuminate, and the unisex perfume collection Private Blend. Rose Prick Eau de Parfum was sold out in a day.

2021–present: Departure from JYPE and solo activities

On January 28, 2021, it was announced that he signed an exclusive contract with BH Entertainment following his departure from JYP Entertainment.

In May, he attended Hugo Boss x Russell Athletic's capsule collection launch event with Shinee's Minho in Seoul.

On July 22, 2021, he was confirmed to appear in the tvN drama Yumi's Cells as Yoo Ba-bi alongside Kim Go-eun. The series based on the webtoon of the same title premiered in September 2021.

On July 29, 2021, he released the self-written, self-composed digital single "Dive" as a gift for fans, along with a special performance clip published on 1theK Originals official YouTube channel. The song, based on the sound of the band, debuted on Billboard World Digital Song Sales Chart at number 12.

In September, he starred in New York Fashion Week's digital fashion short film, Concept Korea New York S/S 2022, for Nohant, a unisex casual brand based in Seoul. The film was released through the New York Fashion Week official website and Korea Creative Content Agency official YouTube channel. On September 29, 2021, he released "Dive (Japanese ver.)".

The following month, Park was confirmed to star as the lead in the crime thriller film A Christmas Carol, based on the novel of the same name, about a guy who goes to a juvenile detention center to avenge his twin brother's death; he will portray both roles. The film, which was selected by the Busan Asian Project Market (APM), began filming in February 2022.

In December, he featured in a 100-page special edition of TMRW magazine. In March 2022, he starred in a three-part cinematic advertisement for the virtual game KlayCity.

In November 2022, BH Entertainment announced that Park would be releasing a solo album in January 2023 to commemorate the 10th anniversary of his debut. On January 7, 2023, BH Entertainment confirmed the release date of Jinyoung's solo album to be on January 18.

On January 18, 2023, Park released his first solo album, "Chapter 0: With".

Personal life
He attended Gyeonggi High School and Howon University.

Military service 
On November 25, 2022, it was reported that Park would be enlisting in the military in March 2023. Later, the agency stated that the enlistment date has not yet been set.

Philanthropy
In February 2020, it was reported that Park had donated an undisclosed amount of money to wild animals affected by fires in Australia. In August 2020, he donated  to the Hope Bridge Disaster Relief Association to help flood victims in South Korea.

On August 10, 2022, Park donated  to help those affected by the 2022 South Korean floods through the Hope Bridge Korea Disaster Relief Association. In December, he donated  to One Love Village, a facility for children with severe disabilities.

On February 9, 2023, Park donated  through Save the Children for the victims of the 2023 Turkey–Syria earthquake, especially children.

Discography

Extended plays

Singles

Songwriting credits
All song credits are adapted from the Korea Music Copyright Association's database, unless otherwise noted.

Filmography

Film

Television series

Web series

Hosting

Television show

Music videos

Ambassadorship

Awards and nominations

Bibliography

Photobooks
Hey Guys, JYP Entertainment and Copan Global (2019), 
Hear, Here, JYP Entertainment and Copan Global (2020),

Notes

References

External links

 
 
 
 

1994 births
Living people
21st-century South Korean singers
21st-century South Korean male actors
Got7 members
JYP Entertainment artists
South Korean male film actors
South Korean male idols
South Korean male singers
South Korean male television actors
South Korean male pop singers